Andrzej Gembicki of Nałęcz coat of arms (died in 1654 in Janów Podlaski) - Roman Catholic bishop, auxiliary bishop of Gniezno in the years 1628–1638, diocesan bishop of Łuck in the years 1638–1654, canon of the cathedral chapter of Gniezno, abbot of Tremesno.

References

1654 deaths